Bispetorv (lit. Bishop's Square) is a public square located in the Indre By neighborhood in Aarhus, Denmark. 

Bispetorv faces Aarhus Cathedral to the north, Aarhus Theatre to the east and is located in or close to the historic Latin Quarter neighborhood. A low sandstone wall bounds the square east, south and west and there are two small fountains with drinking water. The streets of Mejlgade, Skolegade and the squares of Store Torv and Skt. Clemens Torv emanates from Bispetorv. Bispetorv was last renovated in 2016, effectively changing it from a parking lot to a public space which is today a venue for many public events and gatherings in the city. The square is home to notable historic buildings such as Aarhus Cathedral and Aarhus Theatre along with the Viking Museum. Bispetorv measures 110×45 meters. The square features an equestrian statue of king Christian X.

History 
Originally, in the early Viking settlement, the area of present-day Bispetorv was a pagan burial site, and like today, right in the center of town. In the 900s, Aarhus became the seat of the Diocese of Aarhus and in the late 11th century the bishop Peder Vognsen initiated construction of Aarhus Cathedral on and slightly north of the burial site. The cathedral would come to dominate the area henceforth. The cathedral and its diocese grew larger through the following centuries and a number of buildings were constructed south of it for clergy and administration. The primary buildings in the area was a large stone building used by the cathedral chapter and a number of homes for clergy. After the reformation in Denmark the chapter house was turned into the home of the bishop with a large garden and wall facing the street of Kannikegade, immediately south of Bispetorv. Kanikkegade (Canon Street) is named for the canon houses that lined it at the time. In 1881, Aarhus Municipality bought the bishop's house and demolished it in order to create a public space and give the cathedral "room to breathe". The space between Store Torv and the new square was still occupied by a building which wasn't removed until 1921 when Bispetorv was given its current size and shape.  

The square has been a center for Aarhus Festival Week for many years. In 2009, a contest for future use of the square was published. The contest was won by the landscaping company Schønherr which in the following years transformed the square from a parking lot to a public space with trees and greenery. 

Bispetorv has been excavated by archaeologists from Moesgård Museum several times and during a dig in the 1960s many notable artifacts from the Viking Age was uncovered. This incited the construction of the Viking Museum, a small in situ museum, displaying and contextualizing the finds. Later digs, lately in 2009-2011, has unearthed new important finds from the Viking Age and Medieval times of Aarhus and the excavations aims to expand the Viking Museum as a subterranean museum beneath Bispetorv.

References

Publications

External links 
 

Squares in Aarhus
Aarhus C
Odonyms referring to religion